Fernando Soler (born 27 March 1961) is a Spanish sports agent and former professional tennis player. From 2006 to 2018 he was head of tennis for leading sports management company IMG.

In his playing days, Soler was a left-handed player and competed on tour throughout the 1980s, reaching a career high singles ranking of 167 in the world. His Grand Prix main draw appearances included a win over future French Open finalist Mikael Pernfors at the 1984 Washington Open.

References

External links
 
 

1961 births
Living people
Spanish male tennis players
Tennis players from Barcelona
Spanish sports executives and administrators